Woman's Hearts is a 2008 film.

Synopsis 
Once upon a time there was the best Arabic dressmaker of the city: his name was Shakira, he was a travestite and he had to make her wedding gown to Zina, a fiancée just about to get married. But she wasn't a virgin, something inconceivable in the Arab world. To get back to zero miles, they get into an old Alfa Romeo in Turin and head towards Morocco. And that's how the journey that will save their lives starts.

References

External links 

 

2008 films
Italian drama films
Moroccan drama films
2000s Italian films